Lat Pla Khao Road is a road in form of soi (alley) in Bangkok. Regarded as a minor road bridging several main roads, such as Chok Chai 4, Prasoet Manukit, Ram Inthra, and its name also became the name of the place it ran through.

Lat Pla Khao Road begins in Lat Phrao District, as a continuation of Lat Phrao Wang Hin Road at Wang Hin Intersection, where Lat Phrao Wang Hin Road meets Sena Nikhom 1 Road. It northward and slightly deflecting east, as far as entering Chorakhe Bua area and cuts through Prasoet Manukit Road. Then it headed northeast and swerved again in front of Wat Lat Pla Khao temple, and enter Bang Khen District with across Khlong Sam Kha canal, then go straight up till it ends at Lat Pla Khao Junction, where it merged with Ram Inthra Road.

Its name was originally called "Rap Pla Khao" (ราบปลาเค้า) but has been distorted to "Lat Pla Khao" as it is today, because there used to be abundant wallago sheatfish (pla khao in Thai) in this area in the past. The road is also commonly known as "Soi Lat Pla Khao" (ซอยลาดปลาเค้า).

Important figure who lives in the Lat Pla Khao neighbourhood is Sudarat Keyuraphan, a national female politician who was previously the Minister of Health.

Cites 

Streets in Bangkok
Lat Phrao district
Bang Khen district
Neighbourhoods of Bangkok